The North West Regional Assembly (NWRA)  was the regional chamber for the North West England region of the England. It was based at Wigan, in Greater Manchester. It was abolished in July 2008.

Creation and functions

The assembly was created  by the Regional Development Agencies Act 1998. The first meeting was held in 1999. In July 2003 the assembly was reconstituted to combine its existing functions with those of the regional arm of the Local Government Association and of the Regional Employers Organisation.

The NWRA acted as the representative voice of the region and  worked to promote the economic, environmental and social well-being of the North West of England.  The key functions of the assembly were:

Co-ordinate the public expenditure of local authorities
Act as regional planning body
Scrutinise the work of the Northwest Regional Development Agency

Abolition

Following criticism of the regional assemblies, it was proposed in July 2007 that they will be axed, losing their role by 2010.

A regional leaders forum known as 4NW''' was established on 15 July 2008 and the NWRA ceased to exist.

Organisation
Membership of the NWRA was not by direct election. The NWRA represented the interests of Cumbria, Cheshire, Lancashire, Greater Manchester and Merseyside and had 80 members''' nominated by Local Authorities, business, trade unions, further and higher education, environmental interests, and the voluntary, cultural and community sectors including sport and tourism.

Senior Officers

NWRA Political Group Leaders

References

External links
North West Regional Assembly
Local Government Association

Regional assemblies in England
1999 establishments in England
2008 disestablishments in England
Local government in North West England